His Best Friend is a 1962 West German drama film directed by Luis Trenker and starring Toni Sailer, Dietmar Schönherr and Hilti von Allmen.

Cast
 Toni Sailer as Peter Haller
 Dietmar Schönherr as Marius Melichar
 Hilti von Allmen as Anderl Burri
 Hans Nielsen as Direktor Imhoff
 Elke Roesler as Clarissa, seine Tochter
 Carmela Corren as Judith Gerlach
 Peer Schmidt as Pat Nicot
 Hans Richter as Max
 Franz Muxeneder as Paul
 Rudolf Platte as Köhler
 Paul Westermeier
 Fritz Gertsch
 Gaby Banschenbach
 Luis Trenker

References

Bibliography 
 Thomas Elsaesser & Michael Wedel. The BFI companion to German cinema. British Film Institute, 1999.

External links 
 

1962 films
West German films
German drama films
1962 drama films
1960s German-language films
Films directed by Luis Trenker
Mountaineering films
Films set in Switzerland
Films set in the Alps
1960s German films